Courts of South Carolina include:
;State courts of South Carolina
South Carolina Supreme Court
South Carolina Court of Appeals
South Carolina Circuit Courts (16 circuits)
South Carolina Family Courts
South Carolina Probate Courts
South Carolina Magistrate Courts
South Carolina Municipal Courts

Federal courts located in South Carolina
United States District Court for the District of South Carolina

References

External links
National Center for State Courts – directory of state court websites.

Courts in the United States